Pier 7 Heliport  is a heliport located two miles east of Baltimore, Maryland, United States, on the Chesapeake Bay.

History 
Baltimore Helicopter Services was granted access to Washington National Airport without having to land at a gateway airport in 2013.

References

External links 
Baltimore Heliport website
Takeoff from Pier 7

Airports in Maryland
Transportation buildings and structures in Baltimore
Airports established in 2006
2006 establishments in Maryland